The governor-general of Papua New Guinea is the vice-regal representative of the Papua New Guinean monarch, currently Charles III, in Papua New Guinea. The governor-general is appointed by the monarch after their nomination by the National Parliament by vote, although the monarch is not bound to accept that nomination for appointment. The functions of the governor-general include appointing ministers, judges, and ambassadors; giving royal assent to legislation passed by parliament; and issuing writs for election.

In general, the governor-general observes the conventions of the Westminster system and responsible government, maintaining a political neutrality, and has to always act only on the advice of the prime minister. The governor-general also has a ceremonial role: hosting events at the official residenceGovernment House in the capital, Port Moresbyand bestowing Papua New Guinean honours to individuals and groups who are contributing to their communities. When travelling abroad, the governor-general is seen as the representative of Papua New Guinea and its monarch. The governor-general is supported by a staff headed by the official secretary to the governor-general.

Governors-general are appointed for a six-year term of office. Since 28 February 2017, the governor-general has been Sir Bob Dadae.

The office of the governor-general was created on 16 September 1975, when Papua New Guinea gained independence from Australia as a sovereign state and an independent constitutional monarchy. Since then, 10 individuals have served as governor-general.

Appointment

Unlike most other Commonwealth realms, the governor-general of Papua New Guinea is nominated by the country's Parliament, rather than being proposed by its prime minister (as is the convention in the other Commonwealth realms). The appointment is made by the monarch of Papua New Guinea following a simple majority vote of the National Parliament, although the monarch is not bound to accept that nomination for appointment.

The term in office is six years. 

To be appointed for a second term, the governor-general must be supported by a two-thirds majority in the National Parliament. No person may serve for more than two terms. Thus far all retired governors-general have been knighted.

If the office of governor-general becomes vacant, due to death or dismissal, the speaker of the National Parliament of Papua New Guinea becomes acting governor-general until a new appointment is made.

Dismissal

The governor-general may be dismissed by either a decision of the National Executive Council or an absolute majority of the National Parliament. No governor-general has been dismissed from office, although in 1991, Sir Vincent Serei Eri resigned from office after Prime Minister Sir Rabbie Namaliu advised the Queen to dismiss him.

Functions

Papua New Guinea shares the person of the sovereign equally with 14 other countries in the Commonwealth of Nations. As the sovereign works and resides predominantly outside of Papua New Guinea's borders, the governor-general's primary task is to perform the monarch's constitutional duties on his or her behalf. As such, the governor-general carries out his or her functions in the government of Papua New Guinea on behalf and in the name of the Sovereign.

The governor-general's powers and roles are derive from the Constitution of the Independent State of Papua New Guinea Part V Section 1, 2 & 3  and set out certain provisions relating to the governor-general.

Constitutional role

The governor-general is responsible for dissolving parliament and issues writs for new elections. After an election, the governor-general formally requests the leader of the political party which gains the support of a majority in parliament to form a government. the governor-general commissions the prime minister and appoints other ministers after the election.

The governor-general, on the Sovereign's behalf, gives royal assent to laws passed by the Parliament of Papua New Guinea.

The governor-general acts on the advice of government ministers through the National Executive Council, to issue regulations, proclamations under existing laws, to appoint state judges, ambassadors and high commissioners to overseas countries, and other senior government officials.

The governor-general is also responsible for issuing Royal Commissions of Inquiry, and other matters, as required by particular legislation; and authorises many other executive decisions by ministers such as approving treaties with foreign governments.

The governor-general may, in certain circumstances, exercise without – or contrary to – ministerial advice. These are known as the reserve powers, and include:
appointing a prime minister if an election has resulted in a 'hung parliament'.
dismissing the prime minister who has lost the confidence of the parliament.
dismissing any minister acting unlawfully.
refusing to dissolve Parliament despite a request from the prime minister.

Ceremonial role

The governor-general's ceremonial duties include opening new sessions of parliament by delivering the Speech from the Throne, welcoming visiting heads of state, and receiving the credentials of foreign diplomats.

As Commander-in-Chief of the Papua New Guinea Defence Force, the governor-general attends military parades and special occasions such as ANZAC Day and Remembrance Day, and presents Colours and other insignia to units of the Defence Force and the Police Force.

The governor-general also presents honours at investitures under the Papua New Guinea Honours system to persons for notable service to the community, or for acts of bravery.

Community role

The governor-general provides non-partisan leadership in the community, acting as patron of many charitable, service, sporting and cultural organisations, and attending functions throughout the country.

The governor-general also encourages, articulates and represents those things that unite Papua New Guineans together. In this role, the governor-general:

travels widely throughout Papua New Guinea visiting cities, regional centres, rural districts, indigenous communities and disadvantaged groups.
accepts patronage of many national, charitable, cultural, educational, sporting and professional organisations.
opens and participates in conferences where topics of national importance are discussed – such as educational, health, cultural, welfare, defence, economic and rural issues.
attends services, functions, commemorations and exhibitions of local significance, lending their encouragement to individuals and groups who are making a substantial contribution to their communities and to Papua New Guinea.
issues congratulatory messages to Papua New Guineans who achieve significant milestones in their lives such as 100th birthdays and 50th wedding anniversaries.

Privileges

The governor-general acts as the chancellor of the Orders of Papua New Guinea. As chancellor of the orders, the governor-general is appointed as Grand Companion of the Order of Logohu and bestowed the title of "Grand Chief".

Symbols

The governor-general uses a personal flag, which features a lion passant atop a St. Edward's royal crown with "Papua New Guinea" written across a scroll underneath, all on a blue background. It is flown on buildings and other locations in Papua New Guinea to mark the governor-general's presence.

Residence

Government House in Port Moresby is the official residence of the governor-general of Papua New Guinea.

The site for Government House was chosen by Sir Peter Scratchely, Special Commissioner for the Protectorate of British New Guinea, who arrived in Port Moresby in 1885. Government House has occupied this site ever since. In 1913, Sir Hubert Murray took the task of building a new House which superseded the original one.

List of governors-general

Following is a list of people who have served as Governor-General of Papua New Guinea since independence in 1975.

Symbols
 Died in office.

See also
 List of colonial governors of Papua New Guinea#Papua New Guinea

References

 
Papua New Guinea
Governors-General
1975 establishments in Papua New Guinea
Papua New Guinea and the Commonwealth of Nations